The 2003 VMI Keydets football team represented the Virginia Military Institute during the 2003 NCAA Division I-AA football season. It was the Keydets' 113th year of football, and their 1st season in the Big South Conference.

Schedule

Source: 2003 VMI Football Schedule

References

VMI
VMI Keydets football seasons
VMI Keydets football